Trakai ('glades', formerly) is a village in Kėdainiai district municipality, in Kaunas County, in central Lithuania. According to the 2011 census, the village was uninhabited.

History
At the end of the 19th century there was a folwark.

Demography

References

Villages in Kaunas County
Kėdainiai District Municipality